Grande Prairie-Wapiti is a provincial electoral district in northwestern Alberta, Canada. It is one of 87 mandated to return a single member to the Legislative Assembly of Alberta using the first past the post method of voting.

The electoral district was created in the 1993 boundary redistribution from the old Grande Prairie electoral district and significantly modified in the 2017 redistribution.

The district and its antecedent have been a stronghold for conservative candidates in recent decades. The representative for this district is United Conservative Travis Toews. He won election for the first time in 2017. To date there have been four representatives who have held the district.

The riding takes its name from the City of Grande Prairie and the Wapiti River.

Geography
While a predominantly rural riding, Grande Prairie-Wapiti includes a few neighbourhoods on the east side of the City of Grande Prairie (including Cobblestone, Countryside, Crystal Heights, Crystal Landing, Hillside, Ivy Lake, and Smith). Four small towns are also located in the riding - Beaverlodge, Hythe, Sexsmith, and Wembley. The bulk of the riding's area is made up of rural municipalities, including almost all of the County of Grande Prairie No. 1 and a portion of the Municipal District of Greenview No. 16.

The riding's Indigenous community includes the Horse Lake First Nation and the Wanyandie Flats East settlement of the unrecognized Aseniwuche Winewak Nation.

Grande Prairie-Wapiti surrounds the riding of Grande Prairie and borders Central Peace-Notley to the north and east and West Yellowhead to the south. The riding's western boundary is the Alberta-British Columbia border.

History
The electoral district was created in the 1993 boundary redistribution from the old Grande Prairie electoral district. It remained mostly unchanged in the 1997 and 2003 re-distributions. The Boundaries Commission proposed to abolish the district to create a completely urban Grande Prairie district but it changed its decision under public pressure. The 2010 distribution made minor changes to the border with Grande Prairie-Smoky in the city of Grande Prairie but stayed the same in the rural areas.

Boundary history

Electoral history

The electoral district was created in the 1993 boundary redistribution from the old Grande Prairie district. The first representative elected in 1993 was Progressive Conservative candidate Wayne Jaques. He won a hotly contested race over Liberal candidate Dwight Logan to pick up the new district for his party. Jaques was re-elected in the 1997 election with a much larger margin. He retired from provincial politics in 2001.

The second representative was Progressive Conservative was Gordon Graydon who won his first term in office in 2001 with a landslide over a field of five other candidates. He won a second term in the 2004 general election winning over half the popular vote. After the 2004 election Premier Ralph Klein appointed Graydon Minister of Gaming. He held that post until 2006. Graydon retired from provincial politics in 2008.

The third representative is current Progressive Conservative MLA is Wayne Drysdale who was elected in the 2008 election for the first time.

Election results

1993 general election

|}

1997 general election

|}

2001 general election

|}

2004 general election

|}

2008 general election

2012 general election

2015 general election

2019 general election

Senate nominee results

2004 Senate nominee election district results

Voters had the option of selecting 4 Candidates on the Ballot

2012 Senate nominee election district results

Student Vote results

2004 election

On November 19, 2004 a Student Vote was conducted at participating Alberta schools to parallel the 2004 Alberta general election results. The vote was designed to educate students and simulate the electoral process for persons who have not yet reached the legal majority. The vote was conducted in 80 of the 83 provincial electoral districts with students voting for actual election candidates. Schools with a large student body that reside in another electoral district had the option to vote for candidates outside of the electoral district then where they were physically located.

2012 election

References

Alberta provincial electoral districts
Grande Prairie